The British Virgin Islands competed in the 2014 Commonwealth Games in Glasgow, Scotland from 23 July – 3 August 2014. On 7 July 2014 a team of 10 athletes in 3 sports was announced.

Athletics

The British Virgin Islands's team consisted of 7 athletes.

Men

Field

Combined events – Decathlon

Women

Field events

Key
Note–Ranks given for track events are within the athlete's heat only
Q = Qualified for the next round
q = Qualified for the next round as a fastest loser or, in field events, by position without achieving the qualifying target
NR = National record
N/A = Round not applicable for the event
Bye = Athlete not required to compete in round

Squash

The squash team consists of one athlete.

Swimming

The swimming team consisted of two female athletes.

Women

References

Nations at the 2014 Commonwealth Games
British Virgin Islands at the Commonwealth Games
2014 in British Virgin Islands sport